Kārlis Ozoliņš may refer to:
 Kārlis Ozoliņš (ice hockey)
 Kārlis Ozoliņš (tennis)
 Kārlis Ozoliņš (politician)